Events from the year 1540 in art.

Works

Ardabil Carpets
Francesco de' Rossi – Rodolfo Pio da Carpi (approximate date)
Hans Holbein the Younger
Portrait of Henry VIII (Galleria Nazionale d'Arte Antica, approximate date)
Miniature Portrait of Catherine Howard
Michelangelo – Brutus (carved bust, approximate date)
'Südindischer Meister' – Group of Women
Qiu Ying – The Imperial examinations

Births
December 21 - Thomas Schweicker, disabled German painter and calligrapher (died 1602)
date unknown
Robert Adams, English architect, engraver and surveyor of buildings to Queen Elizabeth (died 1595)
Giovanni Anastasi, Italian painter (died 1587)
Andrea Andreani, Italian wood engraver and early exponent of chiaroscuro (died 1623)
Giovanni Maria Butteri, Italian fresco painter (died 1606)
Denis Calvaert, Flemish painter (died 1619)
Cristoforo Coriolano,  German engraver of the Renaissance (died unknown)
Cristóbal de Acevedo, Spanish painter, active mainly during the Renaissance period (died unknown)
Annibale Fontana, Italian sculptor and medallist (died 1587)
Hieronymus Francken I, Flemish painter (died 1610)
Pieter Pietersz the Elder, Dutch painter (died 1603)
Friedrich Sustris, Italian-born Dutch painter working in Bavaria (died 1599)
probable
Étienne Dumonstier, French Renaissance portrait painter (died 1603)
George Gower, English portrait painter who became sergeant-painter to Queen Elizabeth I (died 1596)

Deaths
April 15 - Marguerite Scheppers, painter 
August 24 - Parmigianino, Italian Mannerist painter and printmaker (born 1503)
November 15 - Rosso Fiorentino, Italian Mannerist painter, in oil and fresco (born 1494)
date unknown
Jorge Afonso, Portuguese Renaissance painter (born 1470)
Barthel Beham, German engraver, miniaturist and painter (born 1502)
Vincenzo degli Azani, Italian painter (date of birth unknown)
Gregor Erhart, German sculptor, son of Michel Erhart (born 1470)
Damià Forment, Spanish sculptor (born 1480)
Giulio Raibolini, Italian painter (born 1487)
probable
Hans Leonhard Schäufelein, German painter, designer, and wood engraver (born 1480)
Agostino Veneziano, Italian engraver (born 1490)
Cristóvão de Figueiredo, Portuguese Renaissance painter (date of birth unknown)
Joos van Cleve,  Netherlandish painter (born 1480/1490)
Hans Springinklee, German wood-engraver (born 1490)
1540/1547: Nicola da Urbino - Italian maiolica and ceramicist (born 1480)

 
Years of the 16th century in art